James Bamidele Oluwafemi Alabi (born 8 November 1994) is an English footballer who plays as a striker for National League club Maidstone United.

He has previously played for Stoke City, Scunthorpe United, Mansfield Town, Forest Green Rovers, Accrington Stanley, Ipswich Town, Grimsby Town, Chester, Tranmere Rovers, Dover Athletic, Leyton Orient, Eastleigh and Bromley.

Career

Stoke City
Alabi was born in London Borough of Southwark and began his career with Stoke City playing for the club's academy in 2010–11 before moving to Scottish club Celtic. After a season at Lennoxtown he moved back to Stoke City for the 2012–13 season. On 21 February 2013 he joined League One side Scunthorpe United on loan for a month. After seeing him in training Irons manager Brian Laws compared him as a 'technically better' version of John Gayle, who Laws believes was one of his best signings in his first spell at Scunthorpe. He made his professional debut on 23 February against Hartlepool United at Glanford Park, scoring 10 minutes after coming on as a 67th-minute substitute. On 26 March 2013 his loan spell at Scunthorpe was extended until the end of the 2012–13 season. He remained at Glanford Park for the remainder of the season, playing in nine matches as they failed to avoid relegation.

On 31 October 2013, Alabi joined Mansfield Town on a one-month loan. He made his debut for Mansfield the next day against Southend United but was sent-off after for a late tackle. Alabi then joined Forest Green Rovers on a one-month loan on 28 November 2013. He made his debut on 30 November 2013 in an FA Trophy first round tie against Dartford. He played in six games for Forest Green without scoring before returning to Stoke at the end of December 2013. On 11 March 2014, Alabi joined League Two side Scunthorpe United for a second loan spell with the Iron. He made one appearance for Scunthorpe before returning to Stoke.

On 9 August 2014, Alabi joined Accrington Stanley on a one-month loan. He played three times for Stanley before returning to Stoke. In January 2015 Alabi had a trial with Dutch side De Graafschap.

Ipswich Town
He was released by Stoke at the end of the 2014–15 season and joined Ipswich Town, after impressing Mick McCarthy by scoring 2 goals in 2 appearances for the under 21s side on trial, on a one-year deal on 24 August 2015. On 25 August 2015, Alabi made his Ipswich debut, scoring in a 4–1 win against Doncaster Rovers in a League Cup second round match. On 25 November 2015, Alabi joined National League side Grimsby Town, on loan until 3 January 2016.

Chester
Following his release by Ipswich, Alabi signed for National League side Chester, on a deal until the end of the 2015–16 season.

Tranmere Rovers
Alabi joined Tranmere Rovers from Chester on 10 July 2017.

Leyton Orient
He was placed on the transfer list in May 2019, but removed by the club in July 2019.

Eastleigh (loan)
On 16 January 2020, Alabi signed for Eastleigh, on loan from  Leyton Orient until the end of the 2019–20 Season.

Bromley
On 4th September 2020, Alabi signed for Bromley, as a free agent previously from Leyton Orient in the 2020–21 season.

On 1 July 2022, Alabi left Bromley following the expiry of his contract.

Maidstone United
On 9 July 2022, Alabi joined newly promoted National League club Maidstone United.

Personal life
Born in England, Alabi is of Nigerian descent.

Career statistics

Honours
Leyton Orient
National League: 2018–19

Bromley
FA Trophy: 2021–22

References

External links

1994 births
Living people
English footballers
English people of Ghanaian descent
Black British sportsmen
Association football forwards
Stoke City F.C. players
Celtic F.C. players
Scunthorpe United F.C. players
Mansfield Town F.C. players
Forest Green Rovers F.C. players
Accrington Stanley F.C. players
Ipswich Town F.C. players
Grimsby Town F.C. players
Chester F.C. players
Tranmere Rovers F.C. players
Dover Athletic F.C. players
Leyton Orient F.C. players
Eastleigh F.C. players
Bromley F.C. players
Maidstone United F.C. players
English Football League players
National League (English football) players